State Highway 93 (SH 93) is a state highway in Colorado that connects Golden and Boulder. SH 93's southern terminus is at U.S. Route 6 (US 6) and SH 58 in Golden, and the northern terminus is at SH 119 in Boulder.

Route description

SH 93 runs , starting at its southern junction with US 6 and SH 58 at the entrance to Clear Creek Canyon in Golden. It runs north, just east of the mountains, ending at a junction with  SH 119 in central Boulder.

Major intersections

References

External links

093
Colorado State Highway 093
Transportation in Jefferson County, Colorado
Transportation in Boulder County, Colorado
Golden, Colorado
Arvada, Colorado
Boulder, Colorado